Yaacov Pat (also Yaakov Patt) was a commander of the Haganah in Mandatory Palestine.

Zionist activism
Yaacov Pat was a member of Hashomer, a Jewish defense organization formed in Ottoman Palestine in 1909. Together with Yitzhak Ben-Zvi, later President of Israel, he served in the first Hebrew regiments in World War I. In 1931, Yaacov Pat was sent to Jerusalem by David Ben-Gurion to rebuild the local branch of the Haganah, a Jewish militia. Pat was in charge recruiting men while Rachel Yanait Ben-Zvi was responsible for the enlistment of women. 

Pat's efforts to recruit and train new manpower succeeded but no funding was available for weapons. Rose Vitales, who worked for the Va'ad HaKehilla (Community Council of Jerusalem) convinced Pat that she could organize a fundraising campaign and succeeded in increasing the income of the organization from 40 Palestine pounds a month (approximately $160) to 1,000 Palestine pounds per month, soliciting donations from a screened list of donors. This money was used to purchase arms for defending Jerusalem during the 1936 Arab revolt. 

With the help of Rose Vitales, Pat also pushed for the establishment of a branch of Magen David Adom in Jerusalem, which existed at the time only in Haifa. By 1936, the branch was already functioning.

Commemoration

The Pat neighborhood in Jerusalem is named for Yaacov Pat.

References

Haganah members